Serko Limited, known as Serko, is a travel management and expense technology company headquartered in New Zealand.

Serko publicly listed on the New Zealand Stock Exchange in June 2014 and in the Australian Stock Exchange in 2018 under the ticker code SKO. In October 2019, Booking Holdings purchased 4.7% as part of a partnership deal. In 2020 Serko won the New Zealand High-Tech Awards, winning company of the year.

History 
Serko was founded in 2007 by Darrin Grafton and Robert Shaw, based on a previous business idea. In 2012 Serko received a $2.3 million NZD grant from Callaghan Innovation, the R&D investment arm of the New Zealand Government, and commenced an international expansion, opening a development office in Xi'an, China. Serko subsequently listed on the New Zealand Stock Market in 2014. With the new capital raising, Serko purchased Incharge, an expense provider in 2014, and Arnold Travel Technology in 2015 from Expedia Group. In 2018 Serko launched into the North America market and purchased InterplX in 2019. In 2019, Booking Holdings purchased 4.7% of Serko through a capital raising of $17.5 million NZD, as part of its Booking for Business expansion plans

COVID-19 challenges 

Serko was one of the first NZX-listed companies to issue a COVID-19 pandemic related profit warning in February 2020, well before other key market players and other travel technology companies, causing a 13% drop in their share price immediately following the warning. In the following months Serko announced its worst annual performance in company history with a net loss of $29.4m and revenue halving to $12.4m. Due to the uncertainty, the company conducted a capital raising of $55 million on the market which was oversubscribed. Following a government response to COVID-19 which created normal domestic conditions in New Zealand and the establishment of the Trans-Tasman bubble, Serko returned to pre-covid transaction levels in March 2021, and issued guidance to the market in May 2021 that it expects to make complete recovery by March 2023.

Partnerships 

Serko's main partnerships are with the Flight Centre Travel Group (FCTG) and Booking Holdings.  Serko provides FCTG with a unique corporate online booking tool marketed as SAVI as part of the arrangement.  In terms of Booking.com, a revenue sharing agreement is in place whereby Serko provides the underlying technology for Booking for Business, and Booking Holdings owns 4.7% of Serko and provides travel technology expertise. 

Serko's other main partnership is with Carlson Wagonlit Travel, enabling Serko to expand into the North American marketplace and enabling Carlson Wagonlit Travel to retain market share win the Australia and New Zealand market. 

The company was also the first travel technology company to partner with Southwest Airlines and Qantas to provide their airfares on the newly developed NDC Exchange.

See also 
 Concur
 TripActions

References 

New Zealand companies established in 2007
Travel management